Nguyễn An (Chinese 阮安; 1381 - 1453), known in Chinese as Ruan An (pinyin) or Juan An (Wade-Giles), was a Ming dynasty architect and hydraulics specialist between the first and fifth decades of the 15th century. According to some sources, he was a key architect in designing, planning and constructing of the Forbidden City during the Ming dynasty. Born in Vietnam, he was taken as tribute to China and later became a eunuch and architect in service to the Chinese emperors. He, along with other architects, such as master designers and planners Cai Xin (蔡信), Kuai Xiang (蒯祥), Chen Gui (陳珪), and Wu Zhong (吳中), was a builder of the Forbidden City in Beijing.

Under the reign of the Zhengtong Emperor, Nguyen An also had a role in the reconstruction of the wall of Beijing. He was also a hydraulics specialist, and was involved in at least three hydraulic projects and had a flawless record.  He died in 1453.

See also
History of the Forbidden City

References

Chinese people of Vietnamese descent
Ming dynasty eunuchs
1381 births
1453 deaths
15th-century Chinese architects
Vietnamese architects
Year of birth unknown